McGriff is a surname. Notable people with the surname include:

 Curtis McGriff (born 1958), American former National Football League player 
 Edna McGriff (1935–1980), American rhythm-and-blues singer
 Fred McGriff (born 1963), American former Major League Baseball player
 Hershel McGriff (born 1927), American stock car racing driver
 Jimmy McGriff (born 1936), American hard-bop and soul-jazz organist and organ trio bandleader
 Kenneth McGriff (born 1959), American drug trafficker and organized crime figure
 Lee McGriff (born 1953), American former football player
 Michael McGriff, 21st century American poet
 Perry McGriff (1937–2017), an American politician
 Terry McGriff (born 1963), American former Major League Baseball player
 Travis McGriff (born 1976), American former National Football League and Arena Football League player
 Tyrone McGriff (1958–2000), American former National Football League player

Fictional Character
Selene McGriff, a fictional character from Mobile Suit Gundam SEED C.E. 73: Stargazer